Gail Simone (aka Gladys Simonetti) is an American writer best known for her work in comics on DC's Birds of Prey, Batgirl, Dynamite Entertainment's Red Sonja, and for being the longest running female writer on Wonder Woman to date. Other notable works include Clean Room, Secret Six, Welcome to Tranquility, The All-New Atom, and Deadpool.

She enjoyed a long-running stint on The Simpsons comics, and has also written for television and video games.

Her work has been nominated for a number of awards including the GLAAD Media Award, and she is the recipient of a 2017 San Diego Comic Con Inkpot Award.

Career

Early work
Gail Simone was born and raised in Oregon.

A former hairdresser who studied theater in college, Simone first came to public notice through Women in Refrigerators, a website founded in 1999 by comics fans in response to a scene in Green Lantern #54, in which the titular hero's girlfriend, Alexandra DeWitt, was murdered and her corpse shoved in a refrigerator for the hero to find. The site's purpose was to analyze how female characters are written so as to suffer traumatic indignities, a plot device to advance the narrative of male characters. The site brought her into contact with many people working in the comics industry.

Her column You'll All Be Sorry! appeared weekly on Comic Book Resources. Topics ranged from short, satirical summaries of comic books ("Condensed Comic Classics") to fan fiction parodies.

Comics

2000-2010 

From 2001, Simone wrote Simpsons Comics for Bongo Comics, including an annual Treehouse of Horror special, and regular scripts for Bart Simpson Comics. Simone also penned many Sunday strips for the syndicated Simpsons comic strip.

Simone worked for Marvel Comics' on Deadpool from 2003. After Deadpool was canceled and relaunched as Agent X, Simone continued as writer, but eventually left the project after a conflict with the series' editor. Simone returned to write the concluding arc to Agent X after the series' initial cancellation.

Simone moved to DC Comics, where she wrote Birds of Prey in 2003 from issue #56, which featured an all-female team: Oracle, Black Canary, The Huntress and Lady Blackhawk.

Simone wrote Action Comics with John Byrne as pencil artist. In 2005 Simone wrote the Villains United limited series – part of the "Infinite Crisis" crossover – starring the Catman character. She also wrote a two-issue story arc that focused on Hawk & Dove for a rebooted Teen Titans series with Rob Liefeld as artist. Simone supported Liefeld in the face of public criticism of his art.

Simone's Villains United limited series spin-off Secret Six followed in 2005, which led to an ongoing series in September 2008, and multiple DC crossovers prior to the September 2011 New 52 relaunch.

Other works by Simone include Action Comics, The Legion, Rose and Thorn, Wildstorm's Gen¹³, and an Atom series based on ideas by Grant Morrison and penciled by John Byrne and Mike Norton. She wrote a creator-owned project about a retirement community of super-heroes, Welcome to Tranquility, for Wildstorm, and was a contributor to Tori Amos's Comic Book Tattoo.

In 2007 Simone took over writing duties on Wonder Woman from issue #14. To date, Simone is Wonder Woman'''s longest-running female writer. In 2010 she took over the writing reins on Birds of Prey.

She returned to Welcome to Tranquility for a second limited series in 2010. In 2011 she collaborated with co-writer Ethan Van Sciver on a revamped Firestorm series. Secret Six was canceled  and Simone left Birds of Prey and The Fury of Firestorm.

2011-2020
In 2011, Simone contributed to The Power Within, a Kickstarter-funded comic book that focuses on teen bullying.

As part of DC Comics' New 52 initiative, Simone wrote a new Batgirl title starring Barbara Gordon, which debuted in 2011. Simone introduced a character named Alysia Yeoh, the first transgender character written in a contemporary context in a mainstream comic book.

In 2012, news outlets reported that her exclusivity deal with DC had terminated and she was leaving the Batgirl title as well as DC Comics. In 2012, Simone revealed that she was fired from Batgirl by the book's new editor Brian Cunningham. After fan protests, Simone returned to Batgirl as writer.

In 2013, DC Comics published The Movement by Simone and artist Freddie Williams II, which Simone called "a book about power – who owns it, who uses it, who suffers from its abuse." Also in 2013 Simone wrote a new ongoing Red Sonja series for Dynamite.

Also in 2013, Simone was listed first on IGN's list of the "Best Tweeters in Comics" for the "enthusiasm and thoughtfulness" of her Twitter posts.

In 2014-2015, Simone wrote the Lara Croft series Tomb Raider for Dark Horse Comics, set between the 2013 video game reboot and its sequel Rise of the Tomb Raider.

Oni Press published her graphic novel Seven Days with art by Jose Luis in 2020 as part of an initiative to launch a new Catalyst Prime superhero universe.

Animation
In 2005, Simone penned an episode of the series Justice League Unlimited entitled "Double Date", which featured Question, Huntress, Green Arrow and Black Canary. Originally, Simone intended the episode to feature Batgirl but animation rights for the character were unavailable.

In 2007, Simone wrote an episode of GameTap's Revisioned: Tomb Raider, entitled "Pre-Teen Raider".

She also wrote a 2010 episode of Batman: The Brave and the Bold entitled "The Mask of Matches Malone!", featuring Black Canary and Huntress from "Birds of Prey".

In 2019, she wrote an episode of the series My Little Pony: Friendship Is Magic entitled "Between Dark and Dawn".

Awards and honors
Simone is notable for being one of the most influential women in the comic book industry. Her blog "Women In Refrigerators" raised awareness of the representation of women in comics. Simone believes most female comic characters are targeted at male audiences through oversexualization, and advocates for the creation of female characters that are as powerful, appealing, and commercially viable as male characters, something she strives to achieve in her own work.

 Eisner Award Winner: Tori Amos Comic Book Tattoo (anthology) 2009, Best Anthology (Group Award) 
 Harvey Award Winner: Tori Amos Comic Book Tattoo (anthology) 2009, Best Anthology (Group Award) 
 Women Cartoonists Hall Of Fame, 2009, Friends of Lulu.
Outstanding Comic Book Nominee: Secret Six, 2010, GLAAD Media Award
Outstanding Comic Book Nominee: Secret Six, 2012, GLAAD Media Award
 True Believers Comic Award for Roll of Honor/Comic Excellence, 2014, London Film and Comic Con
 Inkpot Award, 2017, San Diego Comic Con

Notable works
Comics
Bongo ComicsSimpson's Comics #50 "Li'l Goodfellas", Bongo Comics, August 2000
 Simpsons Comics Royale reprinted, Bongo Comics, March 2001
 Simpson's Comics #73, reprinted, Bongo Comics, Titan Magazines, October 2002The Best of the Simpsons#29 reprinted, Bongo Comics, Titan Magazines, April 2006Simpson's Comics #83, "...So You Want To Work for Globex, Huh?", Bongo Comics, August 2003
 Simpson's Comics Jam Packed Jamboree reprinted, Bongo/Harper Collins, April 2006The Best of the Simpsons #37 reprinted, Bongo Comics, Titan Magazines April 2007

Dark Horse ComicsLeaving Megalopolis (with Jim Calafiore, 2014, Dark Horse Comics, .)

DC Comics/Vertigo/WildstormRose and Thorn #1–6 (with Adriana da Silva Melo, DC Comics, February – July 2004)Action Comics #827–831 & 833–835 (with John Byrne, DC Comics, July – November 2005 & January – March 2006) collected as:Superman: Strange Attractors (192 pages, May 2006)Villains United #1–6 (with Dale Eaglesham, DC Comics, July – December 2005) collected as:Villains United (144 pages, January 2006)Secret Six #1–6 (with Brad Walker, DC Comics, July 2006 – January 2007) collected as:Six Degrees of Devastation (144 pages, March 2007)Birds of Prey #56–90, 92–108 (DC Comics, August 2003 – July 2007) collected as:Of Like Minds (with Ed Benes, collects Birds of Prey #56–61, 144 pages, March 2004)Sensei & Student (with Ed Benes, collects Birds of Prey #62–68, 168 pages, February 2005)Between Dark & Dawn (with Ed Benes, collects Birds of Prey #69–75, 176 pages, March 2006)The Battle Within (with Joe Bennett and Ed Benes, collects Birds of Prey #76–85, 240 pages, October 2006)Perfect Pitch (with Joe Bennett and Paulo Siqueira, collects Birds of Prey #86–90 and #92–95, 224 pages, February 2007)Blood and Circuits (with Nicola Scott, Paulo Siqueira and James Raiz, collects Birds of Prey #96–103, 208 pages, August 2007)Dead of Winter (with Nicola Scott, collects Birds of Prey #104–108, 128 pages, February 2008)Welcome to Tranquility #1–12 (with Neil Googe, Wildstorm, February 2007 – January 2008) collected as:Volume 1 (collects Welcome to Tranquility #1–6, 160 pages, December 2007)Volume 2 (collects Welcome to Tranquility #7–12, 144 pages, May 2008)The All-New Atom #1–15, 17–18, 20 (DC Comics, September 2006 – April 2008) collected as:My Life in Miniature (collects The All New Atom #1–6, 160 pages)Future/Past (collects The All New Atom #7–11, 128 pages)The Hunt For Ray Palmer (collects The All New Atom #12–16, 128 pages)Small Wonder (collects The All New Atom #17–18 and #20–25, 198 pages)JLA: Classified 2004 (DC Comics, January 2008) collected as:The Hypothetical Woman (with Jose Luis Garcia-Lopez, Klaus Janson, and Sean Phillips, collects JLA: Classified #16–21, January 2006 – May 2006, ≈134 pages, softcover, January 2008)Wonder Woman vol. 3 #14–44, vol. 1 #600, & vol 5 #750 (DC Comics, January 2008 – July 2010) collected as:
 The Circle (with Terry Dodson, collects Wonder Woman #14–19, January – June 2008, 144 pages, hardcover, November 2008, ; trade paperback, September 2009)
 Ends of the Earth (with Aaron Lopresti, collects Wonder Woman #20–25, July – December 2008, 144 pages, hardcover, March 2009)
 Rise of the Olympian (with Aaron Lopresti, collects Wonder Woman #26–33, January – August 2009, 208 pages, November 2009)
 Warkiller (with Aaron Lopresti, collects Wonder Woman #34–39, September 2009 – February 2010, 144 pages, May 2010)
 Contagion (with Aaron Lopresti, Chris Batista, and Nicola Scott, collects Wonder Woman #40–44, March 2010 – July 2010, 128 pages, October 2010)Secret Six #1–14, 16–36, DC Comics, September 2008 – August 2011) collected as:
 Unhinged (with Nicola Scott and Doug Hazlewood, collects Secret Six #1–7, 144 pages, August 2009)
 Depths (with Nicola Scott and Carlos Rodriguez, collects Secret Six #8–14, 168 pages, April 2010)
 Danse Macabre (with Jim Calafiore, Peter Nguyen and Doug Hazlewood, collects Secret Six #15–18 and Suicide Squad #67, written by John Ostrander, 128 pages, October 2010)
 Cat's in the Cradle (with Jim Calafiore, R.B. Silva and Alexandre Palamaro, collects Secret Six #19–24, 144 pages, January 2011)
 The Reptile Brain (with Jim Calafiore and Pete Woods, collects Secret Six #25–29 and Action Comics #896, written by Paul Cornell, 144 pages, May 2011)
 The Darkest House (with Jim Calafiore, Matthew Clark and Ron Randall, collects Secret Six #30–36 and Doom Patrol #19, written by Keith Giffen, 176 pages, January 2012)Birds of Prey vol. 2, #1–13 (DC Comics, July 2010 – August 2011) collected as:
 End Run (with Ed Benes, Adriana Melo, and Alvin Lee, collects Birds of Prey #1–6, July 2010 – January 2011, 160 pages, hardcover, May 2011, ;)
 The Death of Oracle (with Ardian Syaf, Guillem March, Inaki Miranda, Pere Perez, Jesus Saiz, collects Birds of Prey #7–13, February – August 2011, 200 pages, hardcover, October 2011)Welcome to Tranquility: One Foot in the Grave #1–6 (with Horacio Dominguez, Wildstorm, September 2010 – February 2011) collected as:Welcome To Tranquility: One Foot in the Grave (collects Welcome to Tranquility: One Foot in the Grave #1–6, 144 pages, July 2011)Batgirl 2011 volumes 1–5, #1–34 (DC Comics, July 2012 – December 2014) collected as:The Darkest Reflection (with Ardian Syaf and Vicente Cifuentes, collects Batgirl (The New 52) #1–6, September 2011 – February 2012, 144 pages, hardcover, July 2012)Knightfall Descends (with Ardian Syaf and Ed Benes, collects Batgirl (The New 52) #7–13 and 0, March 2012 – October 2012, 192 pages, hardcover, February 2013)Death of the Family (with Admira Wijayadi, Vicente Cifuentes, Mark Irwin, Johnathan Glapion, Julius Gopez, Greg Capullo, Daniel Sampere, Ed Benes, Scott Snyder, and Ray Fawkes; collects Batgirl (The New 52) #14–19 and Annual #1, Batman #17, and Young Romance #1; November 2012 – Apr 2013, 224 pages, hardcover, October 2013)Wanted (with Derlis Santacruz, Fernando Pasarin, and Daniel Sampere; collected as Batgirl (The New 52) #20–26 and Batman: The Dark Knight #23.1; May 2013 – December 2013, 192 pages, hardcover, May 2014)Deadline (with Marguerite Bennet, Jonathan Glapion, Fernando Pasarin, and Robert Gill; collects Batgirl (The New 52) #27–34 and Annual #2, January 2014 – August 2014, 256 pages, hardcover, December 2014)Clean Room vol. 1, #1-18 (Vertigo Comics, December 2015 – June 2017)

Dynamite EntertainmentRed Sonja Vol 2 volumes 1–3, #0–18 (Dynamite Entertainment, February 2014 – October 2014) collected as:Queen of the Plagues (with Walter Geovani, Adriano Lucas, and Simon Bowland, collects Red Sonja Vol 2 #1–6, July 2013 – December 2013, 180 pages, softcover, February 2014)Art of Blood and Fire (with Walter Geovani, collects Red Sonja Vol 2 #7–12 and 0, January 2014 – June 2014, 176 pages, softcover, October 2014)The Forgiving of Monsters (with Walter Geovani, collects Red Sonja Vol 2 #13–18, July 2014 – May 2015, 160 pages, softcover, Unpublished)Legends of Red Sonja volume 1, #1–5 (Dynamite Entertainment, August 2014) collected as:Legends of Red Sonja (anthology, collects Legends of Red Sonja #1–5, November 2013 – March 2014, 152 pages, softcover, August 2014)

Marvel ComicsDeadpool #65–69 (Marvel Comics, May – September 2002)Agent X #1–7, 13–15 (Marvel Comics, September 2002 – March 2003 & November – December 2003)Marvelous Adventures of Gus Beezer (Marvel Comics)Spider-Man (with Jason Lethcoe, May 2003)Hulk (with Jason Lethcoe, May 2003)X-Men (with Jason Lethcoe, May 2003)Spider-Man (with Guihiru, February 2004)Domino #1-10 (with David Baldeon, Marvel Comics, April 2018 - January 2019) collected as:Domino Vol. 1: Killer Instinct (112 pages, collects Domino #1-6, November 2018)Domino Vol. 2: Soldier of Fortune (128 pages, collects Domino #7-10 and Domino Annual, March 2019)Domino: Hotshots #1-5 (with David Baldeon, Marvel Comics, March - July 2019) collected as:Domino: Hotshots (112 pages, September 2019)

Television
 Justice League Unlimited (2005)
 Revisioned: Tomb Raider (2007)
 Batman: The Brave and the Bold (2010)
 My Little Pony: Friendship is Magic (2019)

Films
 Wonder Woman (2009)
 Red Sonja: Queen of Plagues (2016)

Notes

References

External links

 Bloodstains on the Looking Glass Gail Simone's blog.
 
 
 Warn, Sarah (April 6, 2009). "Interview with Wonder Woman’s Gail Simone". AfterEllen.com.

Interviews
 CAPE 3 Gail Simone Interview
 "The Simone Files I: Birds of Prey". Newsarama, January 24, 2007
 "The Simone Files II: The All-New Atom". Newsarama. January 25, 2007
 "The Simone Files III: Welcome to Tranquility". Newsarama. January 29, 2007
 "The Simone Files IV: Gen13". Newsarama. January 31, 2007
 "The Simone Files V: Nicola Scott". Newsarama. February 6, 2007
 "The Simone Files VI: Readers Axe The Questions". Newsarama. February 12, 2007
 Gustines, George Gene (November 27, 2007). "Wonder Woman Gets a New Voice, and It's Female". New York Times''.

Living people
American comics writers
American feminist writers
Comics critics
DC Comics people
Female comics writers
Marvel Comics people
Marvel Comics writers
Writers from Oregon
Year of birth missing (living people)